Richard Duckett may refer to:

 Richard Louis Duckett (1885–1972), Canadian lacrosse player
 Richard Duckett (MP) for Westmorland (UK Parliament constituency)
 Dick Duckett (born 1933), American basketball player